This article presents the discography of the American country music duo Porter Wagoner and Dolly Parton. While signed to RCA Records as solo artists, Wagoner and Parton released 13 studio albums together between 1968 and 1980. They charted 21 singles on the Billboard Hot Country Singles chart, including the #1 "Please Don't Stop Loving Me".

Studio albums

Compilation albums

Singles

Promotional singles

Notes

A ^ "The Right Combination" also peaked at number 6 on the Billboard Bubbling Under Hot 100 Singles chart.

See also
Porter Wagoner discography
Dolly Parton albums discography
Dolly Parton singles discography

References

Country music discographies
 
 
 
 
Discographies of American artists